Sean Hehir (born 27 January 1985) is an Irish long-distance runner from Kilkishen in County Clare. He is a primary school teacher by profession, having attended Froebel College of Education and Trinity College Dublin.

Hehir won the 2013 Dublin Marathon.  In the 2015 race, he was crowned the Irish national marathon champion for the second time after being the top Irish finisher of the race, four weeks after having competed in the Berlin Marathon where he finished in a time of 2:17.48.

Sean won the 2016 Irish Inter-County Cross Country Championships in Tuam, County Galway. He was the Irish national half marathon champion in 2011 and the Irish Intermediate Cross Country champion in 2009.

Sean ran 2:16.18 at the 2017 London Marathon and subsequently represented Ireland in the marathon at the 2017 IAAF World Athletics Championships in London. He also represented Ireland at the 2014 European Athletics Championships in Zurich, Switzerland where he finished in 20th position in a time of 2:17.5

References

External links
 

1985 births
Living people
Athletes from the Republic of Ireland
Irish male long-distance runners
Irish male marathon runners